WRJO (94.5 FM) is a radio station broadcasting a classic hits music format. Licensed to Eagle River, Wisconsin, United States.  The station is currently owned by Heartland Communications Group LLC.

History
The station went on the air in 1971 as WERL-FM. On 1985-04-05, the station changed its call sign to the current WRJO.

The WERL call sign remains on its AM station at 950 kHz.

WERL was a reference to "Werl (as in "Whirl")-Wide Radio", taken from its early logo in the 1960s and 70s.

Before the oldies format, WRJO held a country music format with the nickname "Eagle Country".

WRJO became affiliated with the Milwaukee Brewers Radio Network taking the affiliation away from sister station WNWX "Mix 96" in Rhinelander.

References

External links

RJO
Classic hits radio stations in the United States